William O'Doherty (1868 – 18 May 1905) was an Irish nationalist politician and Member of Parliament (MP) in the House of Commons of the United Kingdom of Great Britain and Ireland.

He was elected as the Irish Parliamentary Party MP for the North Donegal constituency at the 1900 general election. He died in 1905 and the subsequent by-election was won by  John Muldoon.

External links

1868 births
1905 deaths
Irish Parliamentary Party MPs
Members of the Parliament of the United Kingdom for County Donegal constituencies (1801–1922)
UK MPs 1900–1906
People from County Donegal